In algebraic geometry, the Chow groups (named after Wei-Liang Chow by ) of an algebraic variety over any field are algebro-geometric analogs of the homology of a topological space. The elements of the Chow group are formed out of subvarieties (so-called algebraic cycles) in a similar way to how simplicial or cellular homology groups are formed out of subcomplexes.  When the variety is smooth, the Chow groups can be interpreted as cohomology groups (compare Poincaré duality) and have a multiplication called the intersection product.  The Chow groups carry rich information about an algebraic variety, and they are correspondingly hard to compute in general.

Rational equivalence and Chow groups

(Thus  is negative if  has a pole along .) The definition of the order of vanishing requires some care for  singular.

Examples of Rational Equivalence

Rational Equivalence on Projective Space
Rationally equivalent cycles defined by hypersurfaces are easy to construct on projective space because they can all be constructed as the vanishing loci of the same vector bundle. Schematically, this can be constructed as

Rational Equivalence of Cycles on a Curve

The Chow ring
When the scheme  is smooth over a field , the Chow groups form a ring, not just a graded abelian group. (When  is a variety of dimension , this just means that .) Then the groups  form a commutative graded ring with the product:

The product arises from intersecting algebraic cycles.

More generally, in various cases, intersection theory constructs an explicit cycle that represents the product  in the Chow ring.

Examples

Projective space
The Chow ring of projective space  over any field  is the ring

 

where  is the class of a hyperplane (the zero locus of a single linear function).

 

For example, if  and  intersect transversely, it follows that  is a zero-cycle of degree . If the base field  is algebraically closed, this means that there are exactly  points of intersection; this is a version of Bézout's theorem, a classic result of enumerative geometry.

Projective bundle formula 

Hirzebruch surfaces 
For example, the Chow ring of a Hirzebruch surface can be readily computed using the projective bundle formula. This implies that the Chow ring is isomorphic to

Remarks 
For other algebraic varieties, Chow groups can have richer behavior. For example, let  be an elliptic curve over a field . Then the Chow group of zero-cycles on  fits into an exact sequence

When  is the complex numbers, the example of an elliptic curve shows that Chow groups can be uncountable abelian groups.

Functoriality

A key computational tool for Chow groups is the localization sequence, as follows.

where the first homomorphism is the pushforward associated to the proper morphism , and the second homomorphism is pullback with respect to the flat morphism . The localization sequence can be extended to the left using a generalization of Chow groups, (Borel–Moore) motivic homology groups, also known as higher Chow groups.

Examples of flat pullbacks

Branched coverings of curves 
Consider the branched covering of curves

Since the morphism ramifies whenever  we get a factorization

This implies that the points  have multiplicities  respectively. The flat pullback of the point  is then

Flat family of varieties 
Consider a flat family of varieties

and a subvariety . Then, using the cartesian square

Therefore, we have

Cycle maps
There are several homomorphisms (known as cycle maps) from Chow groups to more computable theories.

First, for a scheme X over the complex numbers, there is a homomorphism from Chow groups to Borel–Moore homology:

The factor of 2 appears because an i-dimensional subvariety of X has real dimension 2i. When X is smooth over the complex numbers, this cycle map can be rewritten using Poincaré duality as a homomorphism

In this case (X smooth over C), these homomorphisms form a ring homomorphism from the Chow ring to the cohomology ring. Intuitively, this is because the products in both the Chow ring and the cohomology ring describe the intersection of cycles.

For a smooth complex projective variety, the cycle map from the Chow ring to ordinary cohomology factors through a richer theory, Deligne cohomology. This incorporates the Abel–Jacobi map from cycles homologically equivalent to zero to the intermediate Jacobian. The exponential sequence shows that CH1(X) maps isomorphically to Deligne cohomology, but that fails for CHj(X) with j > 1.

For a scheme X over an arbitrary field k, there is an analogous cycle map from Chow groups to (Borel–Moore) etale homology. When X is smooth over k, this homomorphism can be identified with a ring homomorphism from the Chow ring to etale cohomology.

Relation to K-theory
An (algebraic) vector bundle E on a smooth scheme X over a field has Chern classes ci(E) in CHi(X), with the same formal properties as in topology. The Chern classes give a close connection between vector bundles and Chow groups. Namely, let K0(X) be the Grothendieck group of vector bundles on X. As part of the Grothendieck–Riemann–Roch theorem, Grothendieck showed that the Chern character gives an isomorphism

This isomorphism shows the importance of rational equivalence, compared to any other adequate equivalence relation on algebraic cycles.

Conjectures
Some of the deepest conjectures in algebraic geometry and number theory are attempts to understand Chow groups. For example:

The Mordell–Weil theorem implies that the divisor class group CHn-1(X) is finitely generated for any variety X of dimension n over a number field. It is an open problem whether all Chow groups are finitely generated for every variety over a number field. The Bloch–Kato conjecture on values of L-functions predicts that these groups are finitely generated. Moreover, the rank of the group of cycles modulo homological equivalence, and also of the group of cycles homologically equivalent to zero, should be equal to the order of vanishing of an L-function of the given variety at certain integer points. Finiteness of these ranks would also follow from the Bass conjecture in algebraic K-theory.
For a smooth complex projective variety X, the Hodge conjecture predicts the image (tensored with the rationals Q) of the cycle map from the Chow groups to singular cohomology. For a smooth projective variety over a finitely generated field (such as a finite field or number field), the Tate conjecture predicts the image (tensored with Ql) of the cycle map from Chow groups to l-adic cohomology.
For a smooth projective variety X over any field, the Bloch–Beilinson conjecture predicts a filtration on the Chow groups of X (tensored with the rationals) with strong properties. The conjecture would imply a tight connection between the singular or etale cohomology of X and the Chow groups of X.

For example, let X be a smooth complex projective surface. The Chow group of zero-cycles on X maps onto the integers by the degree homomorphism; let K be the kernel. If the geometric genus h0(X, Ω2) is not zero, Mumford showed that K is "infinite-dimensional" (not the image of any finite-dimensional family of zero-cycles on X). The Bloch–Beilinson conjecture would imply a satisfying converse, Bloch's conjecture on zero-cycles: for a smooth complex projective surface X with geometric genus zero, K should be finite-dimensional; more precisely, it should map isomorphically to the group of complex points of the Albanese variety of X.

Variants

Bivariant theory 

Fulton and MacPherson extended the Chow ring to singular varieties by defining the "operational Chow ring" and more generally a bivariant theory associated to any morphism of schemes. A bivariant theory is a pair of covariant and contravariant functors that assign to a map a group and a ring respectively. It generalizes a cohomology theory, which is a contravariant functor that assigns to a space a ring, namely a cohomology ring. The name "bivariant" refers to the fact that the theory contains both covariant and contravariant functors.

This is in a sense the most elementary extension of the Chow ring to singular varieties; other theories such as motivic cohomology map to the operational Chow ring.

Other variants 

Arithmetic Chow groups are an amalgamation of Chow groups of varieties over Q together with a component encoding Arakelov-theoretical information, that is, differential forms on the associated complex manifold.

The theory of Chow groups of schemes of finite type over a field extends easily to that of algebraic spaces. The key advantage of this extension is that it is easier to form quotients in the latter category and thus it is more natural to consider equivariant Chow groups of algebraic spaces. A much more formidable extension is that of Chow group of a stack, which has been constructed only in some special case and which is needed in particular to make sense of a virtual fundamental class.

History
Rational equivalence of divisors (known as linear equivalence) was studied in various forms during the 19th century, leading to the ideal class group in number theory and the Jacobian variety in the theory of algebraic curves. For higher-codimension cycles, rational equivalence was introduced by Francesco Severi in the 1930s. In 1956, Wei-Liang Chow gave an influential proof that the intersection product is well-defined on cycles modulo rational equivalence for a smooth quasi-projective variety, using Chow's moving lemma. Starting in the 1970s, Fulton and MacPherson gave the current standard foundation for Chow groups, working with singular varieties wherever possible. In their theory, the intersection product for smooth varieties is constructed by deformation to the normal cone.

See also
 Intersection theory
 Grothendieck–Riemann–Roch theorem
 Hodge conjecture
 Motive (algebraic geometry)

References

Citations

Introductory

Advanced
 

 
 
 
 
 

Algebraic geometry
Intersection theory
Topological methods of algebraic geometry
Zhou, Weiliang